Rama Giri temple has an 800-year history, dating from the 12th Century. It is located near the Dhundhubhi River (part of the Krishna River) in Raghupathipeta village, Kalwakurthy Mandal, Palamoor District (also known as Mahbubnagar) in Telangana, India.

Notes

Hindu temples in Mahbubnagar district

https://gotirupati.com/ramagiri-valeeswarar-swamy-temple/